Alan Patrick Vincent Whitehead (born 15 September 1950) is a British politician who has served as Member of Parliament (MP) for Southampton Test since 1997. A member of the Labour Party, he has been Shadow Minister for Green New Deal and Energy, previously Energy and Climate Change, since 2015. He served as a Parliamentary Under-Secretary of State for Transport, Local Government and the Regions from 2001 to 2002.

Early life and career
Whitehead was born in the London suburb of Isleworth and attended Isleworth Grammar School. He studied Politics and Philosophy at the University of Southampton, where he became President of University of Southampton Students' Union and received a PhD in Political Science. From 1979 to 1982 he was Director of OUTSET, then from 1983 to 1992 he worked for BIIT, being Director, both being charities. Before becoming an MP, Whitehead was the Leader of Southampton City Council from 1984 to 1992 and a professor of Public Policy at Southampton Institute.

Parliamentary career
Whitehead stood for Parliament unsuccessfully for New Forest in 1979. He then stood three times for Southampton Test before finally gaining the seat in 1997.

 1997–1999: Member of the Select Committee on Environment Transport and the Regions
 1999: Parliamentary Private Secretary to Baroness Blackstone, Minister for Higher and Post-16 Education
 June 2001 – May 2002: Parliamentary Under Secretary of State in the Department for Transport, Local Government and the Regions (responsible for local government, the regions and the Fire Service – Whitehead was the minister responsible for Health and Safety)
 October 2016 – April 2020: Shadow Minister for Energy and Climate Change 
January 2020 – April 2020: Shadow Minister for Waste and Recycling in the Shadow DEFRA Team.
 March 2020 – Present: Shadow Minister for Energy and the Green New Deal 

Previous committee memberships:
 Member of the Energy and Climate Change Select Committee

Other Memberships
Chair of PRASEG, the Associate Parliamentary Renewable and Sustainable Energy Group
Co-chair, Associate Parliamentary Sustainable Waste Group
Executive Member, SERA – Labour's Environment Campaign
Secretary of the All-Party Parliamentary Group on Poland
Member, Associate Parliamentary Ports and Merchant Navy Group
Member, Group on Charitable Giving
Member, Estonia All-Party Parliamentary Group

Whitehead voted against the Iraq War on the basis of the mission not receiving endorsement from the UN. He lobbied for changes to the Government's Education White Paper. He does not support building new nuclear power stations, believing that nuclear is uneconomic. He voted in favour of ID cards and for a ban on fox hunting. He supported Owen Smith in the 2016 Labour Party (UK) leadership election.

Brexit

Whitehead was one of the 52 Labour MPs who defied Jeremy Corbyn and voted against triggering Article 50. He claimed that triggering Article 50 without clarity on what would be done was not in the UK's best interest, and he was not prepared to stand by and allow the country to go down what he regarded as a potentially very dangerous path.

Renewable energy
Whitehead has lobbied for the increased use of sustainable energy sources, particularly microgeneration. He criticised the results of the Energy Review, and was the co-author of EDM 2204 which states 'the case for nuclear has not yet been made' and urges the government to 'recognise the enormous potential for reducing energy consumption and greenhouse gas emissions by energy efficiency and conservation, greater use of combined heat and power, and rapid investment in the full range of renewable technologies, including microgeneration.'

As leader of Southampton City Council in 1986, Whitehead proposed that the city council take measures to become a 'self sustaining city' with regard to energy generation. One such measure was the conversion of Southampton Civic Centre to being heated by local reservoirs of geothermal energy.

Whitehead sits as a non-executive director of a non-profit making company called SSEL Ltd, formed to deliver a Combined Heat and Power (CHP) project, which was partially funded by the Government as part of the regeneration of outer Shirley.

The CHP system recycles the by-product 'low grade heat' made during the electricity generation process and uses the by-product to heat water which is piped to local homes. This scheme has been criticised by the current Cabinet Member with Responsibility for Environment & Transport, Matthew Dean, for being unviable and the council's involvement in the project has now ended.

Whitehead's Private Members Bill, was 'talked out' by Conservative backbenchers in 2005, but many of the Bill's most important aspects were incorporated into the Climate Change and Sustainable Energy Act 2006, sponsored by Mark Lazarowicz MP.

Whitehead's amendments to the bill included:
 requiring better compliance of building regulations for energy efficiency
 the removal of planning permission for microgeneration in homes
 new regulations to ensure a minimum energy standard in new homes including microgeneration

Whitehead is an outspoken supporter of action on anthropogenic climate change, and has called debate by members of parliament who reject the scientific view a "flat earth love-in".

Houses in multiple occupancy
Due to the high concentration of houses in multiple occupation in Southampton, in 2007 Whitehead proposed changing planning regulations which would mean a landlord would be required to apply for planning permission if they wanted to convert a family home into an HMO housing more than four people. The proposal was considered as part of the government's current review of the private housing sector, to report in October 2008.

Pre-pay meters
Alan Whitehead is currently campaigning with the National Housing Federation to end the current pricing practice used by several energy companies which sees customers who pay for their electricity or gas via pre-pay meters pay more for the same amount of energy than customers who pay via direct debit. Whitehead argues:
"Ten per cent of pre-pay electricity customers are in fuel poverty compared with only 3.5 per cent of direct debit customers. In short, those who need affordable energy most pay far more for it than those who do not. What is worse, because of the nature of pre-payment, most of them are not aware of that fact."

Education Bill 2006

Along with fellow Labour MPs Estelle Morris, John Denham and Martin Salter, Whitehead co-wrote the so-called alternative education white paper 'Shaping the Education Bill- Reaching for Consensus,' which criticised the weakening of the role of local education authorities in the provision of education services and called for the schools admissions code to be made mandatory.  He voted for the Bill when Alan Johnson, the new Education Secretary, accepted many of the alternative white paper's proposals.

Rebellions
Whitehead has rebelled against a government 3-line whip on the following issues:
 The renewal of the UK Trident programme
 The invasion of Iraq

Whitehead's rebellion against a government 3-line whip on Trident renewal is not surprising, given that archived documents have emerged showing that in 1982–83 Whitehead paid a subscription to Southampton CND.

2006 World Cup
In June 2006, the UK Parliamentary Football Team ran a charity match in Portugal against the Portuguese Parliament, which coincided with part of the 2006 FIFA World Cup. The match and the trip were sponsored by McDonald's as part of their Football in the Community Programme. The UKPFC by the British Medical Association was criticised for accepting McDonald's sponsorship. Whitehead, who at the time played in goal for the UKPFC, fully declared the sponsorship in his register of members interests. He also pointed out the trip was part of a long-standing fundraising campaign between the UKPFC and McDonald's that raised over 20,000 euros for local charities.

In Southampton
Whitehead is a Fellow of the Institute of Waste Management, and member of the Board for The Environment Centre (Southampton) and Third Age Centre (Southampton).  He is a visiting professor in the Faculty of Media, Arts and Society at Southampton Solent University.

In January 2022 Whitehead announced that he would be standing down at the next general election.

Personal life
Whitehead married Sophie Wronska in 1979, and they have a son and daughter.

He is a member of the Saints Trust and plays in the UK parliamentary football team. After looking at the possibility of being the first MP to install a wind turbine installed on his constituency home roof in Highfield, Southampton, Whitehead installed a number of solar panels that were integrated into the roof. During the summer months, Whitehead says he sells electricity from this source back to the national grid.

See also
 Energy policy of the United Kingdom
 Geothermal power in the United Kingdom
 Wessex Constitutional Convention

Notes

References

External links

Alan Whitehead MP official constituency site
 PRASEG, the Associate Parliamentary Renewable and Sustainable Energy Group
Unfair energy pricing
 Homes for all?  The best way to tackle Southampton's housing crisis
 Alan Whitehead's Spring 2005 newsletter
 Southampton is a low carbon city
 The situation in Iraq

1950 births
Living people
Labour Party (UK) MPs for English constituencies
UK MPs 1997–2001
UK MPs 2001–2005
UK MPs 2005–2010
UK MPs 2010–2015
UK MPs 2015–2017
UK MPs 2017–2019
UK MPs 2019–present
Alumni of the University of Southampton
Academics of Solent University
Councillors in Hampshire